Zainichi Korean is a variety of Korean as spoken by Zainichi Koreans (ethnic Korean citizens or residents of Japan). The speech is based on the southern dialects of Korean, as the majority of first-generation immigrants came from the southern part of the peninsula, including Gyeonggi-do, Jeolla-do and Jeju-do.

Due to isolation from other Korean speech-communities and the influence of Japanese, Zainichi Korean language exhibits strong differences from the standard Korean of either North or South Korea.

Languages among Zainichi Koreans
The majority of Zainichi Koreans use Japanese in their everyday speech, even among themselves.

Since most Zainichi Koreans learn Korean as their second language, they tend to speak it with a heavy Japanese accent. This variety of speech is called Zainichi Korean language, a name which, even when used by Zainichi Koreans themselves, often carries a critical connotation.

Sounds

Vowels
While Standard Korean distinguishes eight vowels, Zainichi Korean distinguishes only five, as in Japanese.
{| class="wikitable" style="text-align:center"
!Vowel jamo
|||||||||||||||
|-
!Standard Korean
|||||||||||||||
|-
!Zainichi Korean
|||colspan="2"|||colspan="2"|||||colspan="2"|
|}

Initial consonants
Zainichi Korean, on the other hand, distinguishes only between unvoiced and voiced consonants ( and ), as in Japanese.

{| class="wikitable"
! rowspan=2 | Standard Korean
! colspan=2 | Zainichi Korean
|-
! Beginning of a word
! Elsewhere
|-
| Plain 
| colspan=2 | Unvoiced  or voiced , depending on speakers
|-
| Aspirate 
| rowspan=2 | Unvoiced 
| rowspan=2 | Geminated unvoiced 
|-
| Tense 
|-
|}

There are no geminates after nasal consonants. Thus ,  in Standard, becomes , not .

Final consonants
In Zainichi Korean, again, those sounds are treated differently.

{| class="wikitable"
! Standard Korean
! Zainichi Korean
|-
| Plosives (and )
| Followed by geminated consonants (i.e.  followed by  becomes )
|-
| Nasals (and )
|  (as in Japanese)
|-
| Flap
| 
|-
|}

Grammar
Zainichi Korean grammar also shows influence from Japanese.

Some particles are used differently from the Standard Korean.

Zainichi Korean, however, does not distinguish these two, as Japanese does not either; it uses  form for both continuous state and continuous action.

Writing system
Zainichi Korean is not typically written; standard Korean is used as the literary language.

See also
 Koryo-mar
 Language contact

References

Further reading
 Yim Young Cheoul,  ("Realities of language lives among Zainichi Koreans, Korean Americans, and Koreans"), 1993.
 Shinji Sanada, Naoki Ogoshi, and Yim Young Cheoul,  ("Language aspects of Zainichi Koreans"), 2005.
 Shinji Sanada and Yim Young Cheoul,  ("Sociolinguistic study of Japan by the Korean"), 2006.

External links
   (Zainichi Korean language)

Korean language
Korean dialects
Languages of Japan
Zainichi Korean culture
Korean language in Japan